Rieks de Haas (2 September 1902 – 6 January 1976) was a Dutch footballer. He played in four matches for the Netherlands national football team from 1923 to 1926.

References

External links
 

1902 births
1976 deaths
Dutch footballers
Netherlands international footballers
Place of birth missing
Association footballers not categorized by position